Coquilla may refer to:

 Al Coquilla, a Filipino boxer who lost a 1994 match to Lester Ellis for the vacant IBO light welterweight title
 Hans Coquilla, a contestant on Project Runway Philippines (season 2)
 Teodulo Coquilla, a defeated incumbent in the 2010 Philippine House of Representatives elections
 a hamlet in the municipality of Membribe de la Sierra, Spain
 Coquilla nut, the nut of the South American palm tree Attalea funifera